Chávez or Chavez is a Spanish language surname (derived from Latin Flaviae), also common in the Philippines, with a Portuguese language variant (Chaves). Notable people with the name include:

 Alexis Sebastian Chavez, Argentinian Paralympic athlete
 Agnes Chavez, American artist
 Angélico Chávez (1910–1996), American Franciscan priest, historian, author, poet, and painter
 Armando Chávez (born 1955), Mexican rower
 Armando Neyra Chávez (born 1937), Mexican politician
 Carlos Chávez (football administrator), Bolivian football administrator
 Carlos Chávez, Mexican composer, conductor, teacher, journalist, and the founder and director of the Mexico Symphony Orchestra
 César Chávez, American founder of the National Farm Workers Association, which became United Farm Workers
 Christian Chávez, Mexican actor and singer, most famously known for RBD and for coming out about his homosexuality
 José Chavez y Chavez (1851–1924), cowboy from New Mexico who rode with Billy the Kid
 Coronado Chávez, President of Honduras from 1845 to 1847
 Dennis Chavez, United States politician
 Endy Chávez, Venezuelan Major League Baseball player
 Eric Chavez, Hispanic-American Major League Baseball player
 Federico Chávez, President of Paraguay, 1949–1954
 Fermín Chávez, Argentinian historian, poet and journalist
 Gilbert Espinosa Chávez (1932-2020), American Roman Catholic bishop
 Gina Chavez, American Latin folk singer and songwriter
 Hugo Chávez, President of Venezuela from 1999 to 2013
 Ignacio Chávez (disambiguation), multiple people
 Jeanine Áñez Chávez, interim president of Bolivia (2019–2020)
 Jesse Chavez, Major League Baseball player
 Jesús Chávez, Mexican boxer
 Jorge Chávez, Peruvian airplane pilot
 Jorge F. Chavez, American Thoroughbred horse racing jockey
 Julio César Chávez, Mexican boxer
 Julio César Chávez Jr., Mexican boxer, son of Julio César Chávez
 Kharla Chávez, Ecuadorian politician
 Laura Chavez (born 1982), American blues, soul, and rhythm and blues guitarist, songwriter and record producer
 Linda Chavez, Hispanic-American author and commentator
 Linda Chavez-Thompson, American AFL-CIO official
 Leo Chavez, American anthropologist
 Martha Chávez, Peruvian politician
 Martin Chavez, mayor of Albuquerque, New Mexico
 Néstor Chávez, Venezuelan Major League Baseball player
 Omar Chávez, Mexican boxer, son of Julio César Chávez
 R. Martin Chavez (born ), American investment banker
 Raúl Chávez, Venezuelan Major League Baseball player
 Jose Chavez y Chavez, Old West outlaw, member of the Lincoln County Regulators

Fictional characters 
Domingo Chavez, a fictional character in Tom Clancy's novels
Maurice Chavez, a fictional character in "Grand Theft Auto: Vice City"
America Chavez, a fictional character in the Marvel Universe
Todd Chavez, a main character from BoJack Horseman
Jose Chavez y Chavez, character from the movie "Young Guns"

Spanish-language surnames